Vidar Johansson (born 8 October 1996) is a Swedish long-distance runner. He competed in the 3000 metres steeplechase at the 2020 Summer Olympics.

References

Living people
1996 births
Swedish male long-distance runners
Athletes (track and field) at the 2020 Summer Olympics
Olympic athletes of Sweden
Sportspeople from Halmstad
Sportspeople from Halland County
20th-century Swedish people
21st-century Swedish people